Jonathan Sothcott (born 26 April 1980) is a British film producer and author.

Biography

Before making his name in feature films, Sothcott produced documentaries and moderated DVD commentaries for numerous cult films, including The Wild Geese, Dr. Who and the Daleks, Summer Holiday, and many horror films.

Sothcott is the CEO of Shogun Films, a prolific production company focusing on crime and thriller movies.

Sothcott's published works include The Jermyn Street Shirt (The History Press, 2021) and The Cult Films of Christopher Lee (Eaton Books, 2000).

Selected filmography
Devil's Playground (2010)
Dead Cert (2010)
Stalker (2010)
The Rise and Fall of a White Collar Hooligan (2012)
Riot (2012)
The Fall of the Essex Boys (2013)
Vendetta (2013)
Top Dog (2014)
We Still Kill the Old Way (2014)
Age of Kill (2015)
Eat Locals (2017)
Bonded by Blood 2 (2017)
We Still Steal the Old Way (2017)
The Exorcism of Karen Walker (2018)
The Krays: Dead Man Walking (2018)
Trigger Finger (executive producer) (2018)
Pentagram (producer) (2019)
Nemesis (producer) (2021)
Renegades (producer) (2022) 
Pretty Boy (producer) (2022)

External links

References

British film producers
1980 births
Living people